William Rous (c. 1594 – c. 1635) was an English politician who sat in the House of Commons in 1625.

Rous was the son of Ambrose Rous, of Halton, Cornwall. He matriculated at Broadgates Hall, Oxford on 14 February 1612, aged 17 and was a student of Middle Temple in 1614. In 1625, he was elected Member of Parliament for Truro. 
 
Rous died before 20 June 1635 when administration of his estate was granted.

References

1590s births
1635 deaths
Alumni of Broadgates Hall, Oxford
Members of the pre-1707 English Parliament for constituencies in Cornwall
English MPs 1625